Yuldashevo (Yuldaş) is a rural locality (a selo) in Mikhaylovsky Selsoviet, Fyodorovsky District, Bashkortostan, Russia. The population was 391 as of 2010. There are 4 streets.

Geography 
Yuldashevo is located 52 km south of Fyodorovka (the district's administrative centre) by road. Mikhaylovka is the nearest rural locality.

References 

Rural localities in Fyodorovsky District